Christopher John Kempczinski (born 1968) is an American business executive, and the president and chief executive officer (CEO) of McDonald's Corporation.

Early life
Christopher John Kempczinski was born in Boston, and raised in Cincinnati, Ohio. He is the son of Richard Kempczinski, who was Professor of Surgery and Chief of Vascular Surgery at the University of Cincinnati Medical Center, and Ann Marie Kempczinski, who was a primary school teacher at Terrace Park Elementary in Cincinnati, Ohio. He graduated in 1987 from Indian Hill High School in suburban Cincinnati.

Kempczinski earned a bachelor's degree from Duke University in 1991, and an MBA from Harvard Business School in 1997.

Career
Kempczinski started his career with Procter & Gamble in brand management, and worked for four years in its soap sector division, before leaving to attend Harvard Business School (HBS). After HBS he became a management consultant at the Boston Consulting Group, focusing on consumer products and pharmaceuticals.

In 2000, Kempczinski joined PepsiCo in its corporate strategy & development group, and in 2006, was VP, Marketing, Non Carbonated Beverages, Pepsi-Cola North America Beverages.

Before joining McDonald's, Kempczinski worked for Kraft Foods as executive vice president of growth initiatives, and president of Kraft International. He left Kraft in September 2015.

Kempczinski joined the McDonald's global strategy team in late 2015, and was promoted to president of McDonald's USA in October 2016 where he oversaw the business operations of approximately 14,000 restaurants. In November 2019, he succeeded Steve Easterbrook as president and CEO. Easterbrook was fired for violating company policy by having a consensual relationship with an employee. In contrast, shortly after joining the company, Kempczinski moved to create a "more professional culture" among executives and other staff, focusing on human resources.

In 2021, Kempczincki apologized to employees and the public for private remarks he made about the gun deaths of children at McDonald's. In correspondence with Mayor Lightfoot of Chicago, he blamed parents of the victims: “With both, the parents failed those kids which I know is something you can’t say. Even harder to fix.”  Publication of the exchange "sparked outrage." Chicago civic groups and the Service Employees International Union demanded Kempczinski apologize, saying “Your text message was ignorant, racist and unacceptable coming from anyone, let alone the CEO of McDonald’s.”

Board seats and associations
McDonald's Corp. Board of Directors
Proctor & Gamble Board of Directors
RMHC Trustee

Personal life
Kempczinski is married with two children. He has run marathons, and as of 2020 was running at least 50 miles a week.

References

Living people
McDonald's people
American chief executives of Fortune 500 companies
Duke University alumni
Harvard Business School alumni
Kraft Foods people
1960s births
Boston Consulting Group people
Procter & Gamble people
Businesspeople from Cincinnati
American chief executives of food industry companies
20th-century American businesspeople
21st-century American businesspeople
American people of Polish descent
Businesspeople from Boston